Metasarca is a genus of moths of the family Erebidae. The genus was erected by Harrison Gray Dyar Jr. in 1925. Both species are found in Mexico.

Species
Metasarca euphancra Dyar, 1925
Metasarca euphanera Hampson, 1926

References

Calpinae